Chanderkhani Pass is a pass located in the Kullu District of India at a height of 3,660 metres. It forms a way (pass) between the villages of Rumsu and Pulag to the well known village of Malana, which indirectly forms a trekking route from Naggar to Malana across the Chanderkhani Pass.

The pass has a lot of religious importance as it was once the seat of meditation for the Saptarishi Jamadagni. A legend has it that there was once a local deity named Jamlu of Malana, and he had in his hand a basket of the local gods, once he was on the top of the pass, he opened the basket and incidentally a strong wind came by and blew away all the idols to the nearby peaks, which is why all the nearby mountain peaks of Indrasan, Deo Tibba, Pir Panjal Range & Parbati Range are considered holy and can be seen very clearly from the pass.

How To Reach

Air
The airport is also known as Kullu-Manali airport and has more than a kilometre long runway. Air India and some private airlines have regular flights to the airport. Recently Himalayan Bulls in collaboration with Deccan Charters have started flights on Kullu-Chandigarh-Kullu sector thrice a day. Daily flight service (except Tuesday) has been started by 15 May 2013 at Bhunter airport by Air India from Delhi to Bhuntar and vice versa.
Chandigarh Airport is the nearest international airport.

Road

Rail
Manali is not easily approachable by rail. The nearest broad gauge railheads are at Chandigarh, Pathankot and Kalka. The nearest narrow gauge railhead is at Joginder Nagar.

See Bhanupli–Leh line for the proposed railway line through this area.

References

Mountain passes of Himachal Pradesh
Geography of Kullu district